The Smith & Wesson M&P22 is a semi-automatic pistol chambered in .22 Long Rifle.  It is hammer-fired and blowback-operated, and differs from the centerfire M&P variants, which are striker-fired and recoil-operated.  The M&P22 has a single dot on the front sight and notch rear that is adjustable for elevation and windage. In 2013 the scaled-down M&P22 Compact was released.  The pistol also has a Picatinny rail.

References

Smith & Wesson semi-automatic pistols
.22 LR pistols